The FV180 Combat Engineer Tractor or C.E.T. is an amphibious specialist armoured vehicle of the British Army and has been in general service since 1976. A tracked, lightly armoured vehicle, with amphibious capability, the CET is used by Royal Engineers in ground preparation for bridge construction and towing activities in the front line of battle, such as digging vehicle fighting pits, constructing earthen barriers, repairing roads, recovery of disabled vehicles from water and other obstacles, preparing riverbanks for vehicle crossings and clearing obstacles.

Design 

The two crew sit in tandem positions on the left hand side of the vehicle, each with a set of driving controls facing opposite directions. A large earthmoving bucket is fitted at the rear of the vehicle and a rocket-propelled anchor on a 100m hawser attached to an 8 tonne winch can be fitted to the front. When operated from the rear seat the bucket is used for earth moving; clearing obstacles, paths or digging tank or gun pits and anti-tank ditches. When operated from the front-facing seat it can be driven on the road, and the anchor can be used to pull the CET up steep obstacles such as riverbanks. The winch rope can be deployed to the front or the rear of the vehicle with a maximum pull of 8 tonnes in both configurations.

The vehicle is NBC (Nuclear, Biological and Chemical) proofed and has an air filtration unit, supplying clean air to the crew when operating with the crew hatches closed down in a contaminated environment. The NBC air system is also used to inflate the buoyancy aids required to trim the vehicle when swimming.

An Auxiliary Lifting Attachment (ALA) - a davit with a winch rope roller - fitted to the inside of the earthmoving bucket was used for lifting loads of up to 4tonnes. Loads such as Medium Girder Bridge pallets could be lifted vertically to a height of 1.8m. This then allowed a cargo vehicle to back under the suspended load, the CET could not travel or turn with a suspended load on the ALA due to lateral weakness of the ALA and the proximity of the load to the earthmoving bucket. Use of the ALA was discontinued in the 1990s due to difficulties in annual testing of the safe working load, and a reduced requirement for its use.

The amphibious propulsion is provided by two Dowty water impellers, one mounted on each side of the vehicle and controlled by the commander in the rear seat facing forwards. The water jets are used to steer the vehicle when swimming, this is with the use of movable cowls directing the flow of water. Flotation aids are required to trim the vehicle for swimming and a "wash board" is fitted to the front of the vehicle to prevent the bow wave flooding the crew compartment when entering water. Maximum speed in water is 8.5 knots, the vehicle will wade in 1.8m of water and requires preparation for operating in deeper water than this as it achieves buoyancy. FV180 can tow a "Giant Viper" anti-mine system. It can be airlifted by a C-130 Hercules aircraft.

History 

From 2013 the CET is being replaced by a new, larger vehicle - the 30 tonne Terrier Armoured Digger. This is better protected, equipped with night vision and can be remotely operated if required in more hazardous circumstances.

Operators

Current operators
  India
  Singapore

Former operators
  United Kingdom

References 

Amphibious armoured fighting vehicles
Military engineering vehicles of the United Kingdom
Military vehicles introduced in the 1970s